Roodt is a surname. Notable people with the surname include:

Dan Roodt (born 1957), South African author, publisher, and commentator
Darrell Roodt (born 1962), South African film director, screenwriter and producer
Hendrik Roodt (born 1987), South African rugby union player
Liana Roodt, South African surgeon